The 1992 Sunday League was the twenty-fourth competing of English cricket's Sunday League.  There was no sponsor for this season. The competition was won for the first time by Middlesex County Cricket Club.

The season

Durham were accorded first-class status at the start of the 1992 season, and joined the competition for the first time. They also won their first match on 19 April versus Lancashire. Australian overseas player Dean Jones scored 114, the Durham's first century in county cricket.

Middlesex equalled Sussex's 1982 record of 14 wins in a season. Their opening batsman Desmond Haynes was the competition's leading run scorer. Hampshire's off-spinner Shaun Udal was the leading wicket taker.

This season was to the final one with teams wearing traditional white clothing. The following season had new sponsors and each team would wear its own coloured uniform.

Standings

Batting averages

Bowling averages

See also
Sunday League

References

Sunday League
Pro40